The Green Brook School District is a community public school district that serves students in pre-kindergarten through eighth grade from Green Brook Township, in Somerset County, New Jersey, United States.

As of the 2019–20 school year, the district, comprised of two schools, had an enrollment of 770 students and 81.7 classroom teachers (on an FTE basis), for a student–teacher ratio of 9.4:1.

The district is classified by the New Jersey Department of Education as being in District Factor Group "GH", the third-highest of eight groupings. District Factor Groups organize districts statewide to allow comparison by common socioeconomic characteristics of the local districts. From lowest socioeconomic status to highest, the categories are A, B, CD, DE, FG, GH, I and J.

Green Brook's public school students in ninth through twelfth grades attend Watchung Hills Regional High School in Warren Township. Students from Green Brook and from the neighboring communities of Watchung, Warren Township (in Somerset County), and Long Hill Township (in Morris County) attend the school. As of the 2019–20 school year, the high school had an enrollment of 1,948 students and 160.6 classroom teachers (on an FTE basis), for a student–teacher ratio of 12.1:1.

Awards and recognition
For the 1998-99 school year, Irene E. Feldkirchner Elementary School was recognized with the National Blue Ribbon School Award from the United States Department of Education, the highest honor that an American school can achieve.

Schools
Schools in the district (with 2019-20 enrollment data from the National Center for Education Statistics) are:
Elementary school
Irene E. Feldkirchner Elementary School with 374 students in grades PreK-4
Crista Fenton, Principal
Middle school
Green Brook Middle School with 393 students in grades 5-8
Alicia Subervi, Principal

Administration
Core members of the district's administration are:
Dr. James Bigsby, Superintendent of Schools
Stephen Fried, Business Administrator and Board Secretary

Board of education
The district's board of education is comprised of nine members who set policy and oversee the fiscal and educational operation of the district through its administration. As a Type II school district, the board's trustees are elected directly by voters to serve three-year terms of office on a staggered basis, with three seats up for election each year held (since 2012) as part of the November general election. The board appoints a superintendent to oversee the day-to-day operation of the district.

References

External links

School Data for the Green Brook School District, National Center for Education Statistics
Watchung Hills Regional High School website
Green Brook Schools' Alumni Site

Green Brook Township, New Jersey
New Jersey District Factor Group GH
School districts in Somerset County, New Jersey